Levi Díaz (born 11 August 2008) is a Spanish singer who first rose to fame in 2021, where he won the sixth season of La Voz Kids, as part of team Melendi.

Biography
Díaz was born on 11 August 2008 in Cornellà de Llobregat. He currently studies music with vocal coach Miguel Manzo, in addition to academic studies.

Career

Early years

La Voz Kids
Díaz competed in the reality competition La Voz Kids twice. In 2019, he auditioned with "We've Only Just Begun" by The Carpenters but was eliminated in the episode. Two years later, Díaz returned to compete in sixth season and won. Here's all his performances.

Junior Eurovision Song Contest 2021
Díaz was chosen as Spanish entrant in the 19th annual Junior Eurovision Song Contest 16 September 2021. His song "Reír", written by David Roma, was released on 18 October with a lyric video filmed throughout Madrid.

At the contest in Paris, "Reír" placed 15th in a field of 19 songs, receiving 77 points, making it the lowest placing Spain achieved so far. Despite the loss, the positive response was overwhelming. Shortly after the competition, RTVE's Head of Delegation Eva Mora said she was proud of Díaz for representing Spain.

Díaz later performed "Reír" on RTVE's televised concert ¡Feliz 2022! and again with a full orchestra during Gala de Reyes.

Artistry

Influences
Díaz is influenced by modern pop music and is a big fan of Rosalía.

Personal life
On 31 May 2022, Díaz came out as gay.

Discography

Singles

Guest appearances

References

Living people
2008 births
Spanish child singers
21st-century Spanish male singers
Spanish pop singers
Junior Eurovision Song Contest entrants
The Voice Kids contestants
Spanish LGBT singers
Spanish gay musicians
Gay singers
People from Cornellà de Llobregat